One Way Down is a post-hardcore rock band that formed in late 1996. Formerly created under the name "Decepticans," the name came from the French slang for "liars". They have shared the stage with bands such as L.A. Guns, Gilby Clarke, Taken, Snapcase, Stretch Armstrong and Social Distortion. They completed their first European tour with Wanker Records (the German Record Label) and Al Cheapo (punk band from Germany).

While doing work for Buddyhead Records, producer Paul Kostabi contacted Chris Ekstedt for assistance finding a band to accompany an ongoing project with The Willowz. From this, Kostabi signed One Way Down's to his label Artmonkey Records.

After enlisting the help of producer Paul Kostabi, One Way Down immediately began re-recording and re-mastering Decepticans' album "No Holding Back" into what became the CD "Scheisse".

In the Summer of 2005, One Way Down recorded four more tracks for a split CD with Al Cheapo for the European tour "Eine Kleine Nachtmusik”.

Band members 

 Chris Ekstedt - vocals/guitar/keyboard/bass (1996- )
 Jeff Blanco - bass (1996- )
 Mike Schoettler - drums (1996-1999 )
 Matt Philips - drums (2001-2006)
 Nick Wanker - bassist (2005-2007 )
 Paul Kostabi - guitar, bass, backing vocals, keyboards (2001-2006)

Discography 

 No Holding Back (1996 Born Innocent Records)
 Focused-Grouped to Death (1999 OC Weekly Compilation)
 Buddy List (1999 Fast Sofa Records Compilation)
 Scheisse (2004 · Artmonkey Records)
 Scheisse (2004 · Wanker Records CD and 12 inch vinyl euro release)
 Eine Kleine Nachtmusik (2005 · Wanker Records | Split with Al Cheapo)
 Live In Berlin (2006 • Wanker Records)
 Swaying In The Breeze (2007 or 2008 in production • Wanker Records)
 V/A Killer In Your Radio Vol.03 CD (2005 · Wanker Records) feat. 'I'm leaving here' Track 
 V/A Ox Fanzine Sampler #48 CD (2005 · Ox Fanzine) feat. 'I'm leaving here' Track 
 V/A Ox Fanzine Sampler #50 CD (2005 · Ox Fanzine) feat. 'My Breaking Point' Track

External links 
 One Way Down - MySpace page

American post-hardcore musical groups
Musical groups established in 1996